Therlinya is a genus of Australian sheetweb spiders that was first described by M. R. Gray & H. M. Smith in 2002.

Species
 it contains eleven species, found in Victoria, New South Wales, and Queensland:
Therlinya angusta Gray & Smith, 2002 – Australia (Queensland)
Therlinya ballata Gray & Smith, 2002 – Australia (New South Wales)
Therlinya bellinger Gray & Smith, 2002 – Australia (New South Wales)
Therlinya foveolata Gray & Smith, 2002 – Australia (Victoria)
Therlinya horsemanae Gray & Smith, 2002 – Australia (Queensland)
Therlinya kiah Gray & Smith, 2002 (type) – Australia (New South Wales, Victoria)
Therlinya lambkinae Gray & Smith, 2002 – Australia (Queensland)
Therlinya monteithi Gray & Smith, 2002 – Australia (Queensland)
Therlinya nasuta Gray & Smith, 2002 – Australia (Queensland)
Therlinya vexillum Gray & Smith, 2002 – Australia (Queensland)
Therlinya wiangaree Gray & Smith, 2002 – Australia (Queensland, New South Wales)

See also
 List of Stiphidiidae species

References

Araneomorphae genera
Spiders of Australia
Stiphidiidae